Eosphoropteryx is a genus of moths of the family Noctuidae.

Species
 Eosphoropteryx thyatyroides Guenée, 1852

References
 Eosphoropteryx at Markku Savela's Lepidoptera and Some Other Life Forms
 Natural History Museum Lepidoptera genus database

Plusiinae